Port Said is a 1948 American thriller film directed by Reginald Le Borg and starring Gloria Henry, William Bishop and Steven Geray.

The film's sets were designed by the art director Rudolph Sternad.

Plot

Cast
 Gloria Henry as Gila Lingallo / Helena Guistano  
 William Bishop as Leslie Sears  
 Steven Geray as Alexis Tacca  
 Edgar Barrier as The Great Lingallo  
 Richard Hale as Mario Giustano  
 Ian MacDonald as Jakoll  
 Blanche Zohar as Thymesia  
 Robin Hughes as Bunny Beacham  
 Jay Novello as Taurk  
 Ted Hecht as Carlo  
 Lester Sharpe as Lt. Zaki  
 Martin Garralaga as Hotel Porter

References

Bibliography
 Dick, Bernard F. Columbia Pictures: Portrait of a Studio. University Press of Kentucky, 2015.

External links
 

1948 films
1940s thriller films
American thriller films
Columbia Pictures films
Films directed by Reginald Le Borg
Films set in Egypt
American black-and-white films
1940s English-language films
1940s American films